t.A.T.u. Remixes, or simply Remixes, is an official compilation of remixes from t.A.T.u. The album features remixes from 200 Po Vstrechnoy as well as from 200 km/h in the Wrong Lane and some new remixes. The Russian release included one CD format, other one includes two CDs and one DVD that featured music videos, video remixes and live performances, however, other releases did not include an extra CD or DVD.

There were two singles from the album; "Prostye Dvizhenia" and "Ne Ver', Ne Boysia". "Prostye Dvizhenia" was released first. The song did not chart in any country, and the official release was cancelled, due to the lack of promotion of the single. To date, this album is the only album to have "Prostye Dvizheniya".

"Ne Ver, Ne Boysia, Ne Prosi" was released as a single as well. The song was used for the Eurovision Song Contest in 2003. The group represented Russia in Riga, Latvia. The group were placed third. A music video was released on their official YouTube account. The song was also used on their greatest hits album The Best (2006).

Track listing 

 Also contains a photo gallery.

Charts

Weekly charts

Monthly charts

Certifications

References

T.A.T.u. albums
2003 remix albums
2003 video albums
Music video compilation albums
Interscope Records remix albums
Interscope Records compilation albums
Interscope Records video albums
2003 compilation albums
Universal Records compilation albums
Universal Records remix albums
Universal Records video albums